Changan Ford (full name Changan Ford Automobile Co., Ltd.) is a Chinese automotive manufacturing company headquartered in Chongqing. It is a 50/50 joint venture between local Changan Automobile and US-based Ford Motor Company. The company's principal activity is the manufacture of Ford brand passenger cars for the Chinese market. The company was formed in Dec. 2012 after the decision to restructure Changan Ford Mazda, whereby Ford and Mazda agreed to work with Changan as separate joint ventures. Currently, Changan Ford's entire production base is the largest manufacturing location outside Detroit, Michigan for Ford. It has plants in Chongqing, Hangzhou & Harbin.

History
In late 2012, China approved division of the Changan Ford Mazda joint venture 50-50 into separate Ford and Mazda components.

In 2013, Changan Ford opened a new engine plant in Chongqing with an investment of US$500 million.

On Jun. 18, 2014, Changan Ford opened its transmission plant in Chongqing with an investment of US$350 million. This is the first transmission plant for Ford in the Asia-Pacific region.

In 2015, Changan Ford acquired Harbin Hafei Automobile Group Co, a subsidiary of Chongqing Changan's parent company, for  vehicle production started in the second half of 2016.

Products

Current
Ford Escort
Ford Explorer
Ford Escape
Ford Focus
Ford Mondeo
Ford Taurus
Ford Edge
Ford Evos
Ford Mustang Mach-E
Lincoln Corsair
Lincoln Aviator
Lincoln Nautilus
Lincoln Zephyr

Former
Ford Fiesta
Ford Mondeo Zhisheng
Ford S-Max
Ford Kuga (replaced by the Ford Escape)
Ford EcoSport

Gallery

Sales

References

External links
 

Ford
Ford Motor Company
Car manufacturers of China
Electric vehicle manufacturers of China